Burgruine Ras is a ruined castle in Carinthia, Austria. It was first documented in 1171. Only the remnants of an encompassing wall and two round towers are present today.

See also
List of castles in Austria

References

Castles in Carinthia (state)